Kalibek is a bittern salt lake in Taiynsha District, North Kazakhstan Region, Kazakhstan.

Geography
Kalibek lies in the southern part of the Ishim Plain, southwest of the Russian border. It is an endorheic lake located in a depression between Shaglyteniz to the west and Kishi-Karoy to the east. Kalibek is fed mainly by snow and rain. The lake bottom is clayey and its shores are low and gently-sloping. Its surface greatly decreases after the spring floods. 

A number of intermittent small streams flow into the lakeshore, the two main ones from the southwest. Ushsay, a small, narrow lake located in the northeast, is connected to Kalibek by a channel. Formerly there was exploitation of salt for commercial purposes at the lake.

See also
List of lakes of Kazakhstan

References

External links

Kalibek — Lakes - LakeNet
GEOCHEMICAL PROCESSES CONTROLLING THE WATER CHEMISTRY OF SALINE LAKES IN THE NORTH KAZAKHSTAN REGION
ИНТЕЛЛЕКТУАЛЬНАЯ НАЦИЯ В ФОКУСЕ ГУМАНИТАРНЫХ ТЕХНОЛОГИЙ (in Russian)

Lakes of Kazakhstan
Endorheic lakes of Asia
North Kazakhstan Region
West Siberian Plain